Bonnel is a surname, and may refer to:

 Eric Bonnel (born 1974), French weightlifter
 Johnny Bonnel (21st century), American punk rock singer
 Joseph Bonnel (1939–2018), French former football midfielder
 Ulane Bonnel (1918-2006), American naval historian

See also

 Bonel
 Bonnell (disambiguation)
 Bonnelly

French-language surnames